Don Potter is an American musician and producer in Nashville, Tennessee. A longstanding producer for Wynonna Judd, he has become known as "the man who created the Judds' sound".

Musical career
Potter has been singing, playing guitar, writing songs, and recording and producing music since the 1960s, and has performed with many notable artists. He played acoustic guitar on the 1971 release of Chuck Mangione's Friends & Love - a Chuck Mangione Concert. Potter used to be a member of the Show Stoppers rock and roll band and the Don Potter and Bat McGrath duo based in Rochester, New York

Potter's website gives emphasis to his ministry as a worship leader in churches, with the style of prophetic worship, seeking to be led by the Holy Spirit in every meeting.

As well as recording numerous albums of his own music, Potter has written many articles and a book about worship called Facing the Wall.

Don Potter resides in North Carolina.

Discography
2000
Confederate Railroad - Rockin' Country Party Pack (Acoustic Guitar )
The Judds - Number One Hits (Assistant Producer)
Kenny Chesney - Greatest Hits (Acoustic Guitar)
Chuck Mangione - Chuck Mangione's Finest Hour (Guitar, Vocals )

1999
Michael Johnson - Very Best of Michael Johnson (Producer )
Lee Roy Parnell - Hits & Highways Ahead (Acoustic Guitar )

1998
Lyle Lovett - Step Inside This House (Acoustic Guitar)

1997
Etta James - Love's Been Rough on Me (Acoustic Guitar)
Wynonna Judd - Collection (Acoustic Guitar, Electric Guitar, Assistant Producer)
William Topley - Black River (Acoustic Guitar)
Anita Cochran - Back To You (Acoustic Guitar)

1996
John Michael Montgomery - What I Do Best (Acoustic Guitar)
The Judds - Volume 2 - Greatest Hits (Acoustic Guitar, Guitar, Rhythm Guitar, Lead Guitar, Bandleader, Assistant Producer)
Phil Driscoll - Selah II - Original Improvisations Of The Holy Scriptures  (Acoustic Guitar)
Mindy McCready - Ten Thousand Angels (Acoustic Guitar)
David Ball - Starlight Lounge (Acoustic Guitar)
Lyle Lovett - Road To Ensenada (Acoustic Guitar, Spanish Guitar)
Wynonna Judd - Revelations (Acoustic Guitar, Electric Piano, Associate Producer)
Clint Black - Greatest Hits (Acoustic Guitar)
Confederate Railroad - Greatest Hits (Acoustic Guitar)
Mark Knopfler - Golden Heart (Acoustic Guitar)
Susan Ashton - Distant Call (Acoustic Guitar)
Toby Keith - Blue Moon (Acoustic Guitar)
Neal McCoy - You Gotta Love That (Acoustic Guitar)
Paul Overstreet - Time (Acoustic Guitar)
My Utmost for His Highest: The Covenant - Various Artists (Acoustic Guitar)

1995
Michael James - Where Love Runs Deep (Acoustic Guitar)
Terri Clark - Terri Clark (Acoustic Guitar, Electric Guitar)
Dolly Parton - Something Special (Acoustic Guitar)
Willie Nelson - Revolutions Of Time - Journey 19 (Acoustic Guitar)
Kirk Whalum - In This Life (Electric Guitar)
Toby Keith - Boomtown (Acoustic Guitar)
Kenny Chesney - All I Need To Know (Acoustic Guitar)
My Utmost for His Highest - Various Artists (Acoustic Guitar)

1994
Faith Hill - Take Me As I Am (Acoustic Guitar, Electric Guitar)
Phil Driscoll - Selah I - Original Improvisations Of The Holy Scriptures (Acoustic Guitar) 
Rick Trevino - Rick Trevino (Acoustic Guitar)
Conway Twitty Collection (Acoustic Guitar)

1993
Elton John - Duets (Acoustic Guitar)
Toby Keith - Toby Keith (Acoustic Guitar, Electric Guitar)
Shelby Lynne - Temptation (Acoustic Guitar, Electric Guitar)
Wynonna Judd - Tell Me Why (Acoustic Guitar, Associate Producer)
Kathy Mattea - Good News (Electric Guitar)
Ricky Van Shelton - Bridge I Didn't Burn (Acoustic Guitar, Pedal Steel)

1992
Wynonna Judd - Wynonna (Acoustic Guitar, Electric Guitar, Assistant Producer)
Kathy Mattea - Lonesome Standard Time (Acoustic Guitar, Electric Guitar)
Steve Green - Hymns - A Portrait Of Christ (Electric Guitar)
Trisha Yearwood - Hearts In Armor (Acoustic Guitar)
Clint Black - Hard Way (Acoustic Guitar, Electric Guitar)
Ricky Van Shelton - Greatest Hits Plus (Acoustic Guitar)
Moe Bandy - Greatest Hits (Acoustic Guitar, Electric Guitar)
Brendan Croker - Great Indoors (Acoustic Guitar, Electric Guitar)
Carman - Comin' On Strong (Acoustic Guitar)

1991
Hank Williams, Jr. - Pure Hank - Vol. 19 (Acoustic Guitar)
Mark O'Connor - New Nashville Cats (Acoustic Guitar)
Holly Dunn - Milestones - Greatest Hits (Acoustic Guitar)
Hank Williams, Jr. - Maverick (Acoustic Guitar)
Bob Seger - Fire Inside (Acoustic Guitar)
The Judds - Love Can Build A Bridge (Acoustic Guitar, Electric Guitar, Rhythm Guitar, Bandleader, Assistant Producer)

1990
Pinkard & Bowden - Live (Acoustic Guitar)
The Judds - River Of Time (Acoustic Guitar, Electric Guitar, Bandleader)
Lorrie Morgan - Leave The Light On (Acoustic Guitar)

1988
The Judds - Greatest Hits (Acoustic Guitar, Rhythm Guitar, Bandleader, Background Vocals )

1987
Ricky Van Shelton - Wild-Eyed Dream (Acoustic Guitar)
Reba McEntire - Last One To Know (Acoustic Guitar)
The Judds - Heartland (Acoustic Guitar, Electric Guitar, Rhythm Guitar, Bandleader)

1986
Reba McEntire - What Am I Gonna Do About You (Acoustic Guitar)

1985
The Judds - Rockin' With The Rhythm (Acoustic Guitar, Rhythm Guitar, Bandleader)

1984
Carman - Comin’ On Strong, "Light of Jesus to the World" (Acoustic Guitar)
The Judds - Why Not Me (Acoustic Guitar, Rhythm Guitar, Bandleader)

1981
Don Potter - "Don Potter" (Acoustic Guitar)

1978
Don Potter - "Over the Rainbow" (Acoustic Guitar)
Chuck Mangione - Children of Sanchez (Vocals)

1977
Raffi - Adult Entertainment (Producer, Acoustic Guitar, Electric Guitar, Kalimba, Backing Vocals)

1975
Dan Hill - Dan Hill (Acoustic Guitar, Vocals)

1973
Chuck Mangione - Land Of Make Believe (Acoustic Guitar, Electric Guitar, Electric Piano)

1972
Chuck Mangione - Together: A New Chuck Mangione Concert (Acoustic Guitar, Harmonica, Vocals)

1971
Chuck Mangione - Friends and Love - a Chuck Mangione Concert (Acoustic Guitar, Harmonica, Vocals)

1969
Bat McGrath and Don Potter - Introducing Bat McGrath & Don Potter (Acoustic Guitar, Vocals)

References

External links
http://www.potterhausmusic.net - official website

American acoustic guitarists
American male guitarists
American country guitarists
American rock guitarists
Year of birth missing (living people)
Living people
Resonator guitarists
Lyle Lovett and His Large Band members